In Europe Autocross is car racing on a race track with unsealed surface (dirt, gravel or soil). Cars compete against the clock, and start at the same time. A well attended international series is the FIA European Championship for Autocross Drivers.

History 
Autocross started in the end of the 1940s in the United Kingdom as a club competition. It took until 1968 when the first Autocross event was staged in continental Europe (Austria). In 1976 the FIA created standardized Autocross rules and started a European Autocross cup for specialized cross cars. In 1979 a cup for touring cars was added. In 1981 both categories were promoted to be a European Championship for Autocross Drivers.

See also

 Autograss
 British autocross
 Crosskart
 Folkrace
 Rallycross

External links 

 Technical FIA Regulations for Rallycross and Autocross Cars

 
European auto racing series
Rallycross racing series
Recurring sporting events established in 1976
1976 establishments in Europe
World auto racing series
Off-road racing series